Tazo Tea Company is a tea and herbal tea blender and distributor founded in Portland, Oregon. It is now a division of Ekaterra and is based in Kent, Washington.

History
Tazo Tea was founded in 1994 by Steven Smith. The manufacturing and distribution was maintained by North American Tea & Coffee, a Canadian-based food manufacturing company.

Tazo approached then Starbucks CEO Howard Schultz in 1998, seeking further investment partners. The company was purchased by Starbucks in 1999 for $8.1 million.

Starbucks opened the first Tazo-branded tea shop in November 2012. It closed a year later and was converted into a Teavana store.

In November 2017, Starbucks sold Tazo to Unilever for $384 million.

Marketing

The company uses "New Age"-style marketing and product labeling. For example, every box of tea was once labeled as "blessed by a certified tea shaman" and an original tag line was "The Reincarnation of Tea."

Until 2013, the logo used the Exocet typeface, slightly modified. For example, the T in Tazo was changed for readability purposes in 2006 by sliding the cross-piece toward the top of the letter.

See also
 Stash Tea Company

References

External links

Official Website

Tea companies of the United States
Tea brands in the United States
Ekaterra
Former Unilever brands
Starbucks
Food and drink companies established in 1994
American companies established in 1994
Food and drink companies based in Washington (state)
Companies based in Kent, Washington
1994 establishments in Oregon
1999 mergers and acquisitions
2017 mergers and acquisitions
American subsidiaries of foreign companies